Schöne is a German surname. Notable people with the surname include:

Albrecht Schöne (born 1925), German Germanist
Alfons Schöne, German Olympic fencer
Barbara Schöne (born 1947), German actress
Georg Schöne (1875–1960), German physician
Irene H. Schöne (born 1942), German economist and politician
Lasse Schöne (born 1986), Danish footballer
Lotte Schöne (1891–1977), Austrian soprano
Maja Schöne (born 1976), German actress
Max Schöne (1880–1961), German swimmer
Reiner Schöne (born 1942), German actor
Richard Schöne (1840–1922), German archaeologist and philologist
Sabine Schöne (born 1974), German squash player
Wolfgang Schöne (born 1940), German bass-baritone

See also
Die schöne Müllerin a German song cycle
Schöne Bescherung a German song

German-language surnames